Post-amendment to the Tamil Nadu Entertainments Tax Act 1939 on 1 April 1958, Gross jumped to 140 per cent of Nett Commercial Taxes Department disclosed 9.82 crore in entertainment tax revenue for the year.

The following is a list of films produced in the Tamil film industry in India in 1971, in alphabetical order.

1971

References

Films, Tamil
Lists of 1971 films by country or language
1971
1970s Tamil-language films